The Hindu Aikya Vedi (HAV), Aikya Hindu Vedika, or Hindu United Front is a Hindu nationalist organisation in the state of Kerala, India.

History
The first chairman of HAV was Swami Sathyananda Saraswathi.
The first President of HAV was J.Sisupalan.
The idea of HAV come from J.Sisupalan he talk with Swami Sathyananda Saraswathi and they formed HAV. J.Sisupalan before was State General Convenor of Hindu Munnani Kerala later when BJP formed in Kerala Hindu Munnani before stand in Elections closed its work in Kerala.
The HAV also funded the restoration of two large temples in the village of Kesalingayapalli and also implemented certain policies that made the village more Hindu, from ordering children to read the Bhagavad Gita every night to banning Christian evangelists from entering the village. Pleased by the success of their policies, the HAV also applied the same policies to other villages.

Criticism
Lately HAV has been associated with supporting comments of the beef ban in Maharashtra

Notes

Further reading
The Hindu : Kerala / Thiruvananthapuram News : Withdraw award for Hussain: Hindu Aikya Vedi

Hindu organisations based in India
Hindutva
Sangh Parivar
Hinduism in Kerala